John Blake Powell, PC (Ire), KC (1870 – 13 September 1923) was an Irish solicitor, barrister and judge.

He was the eldest son of  John Powell of Ballytivan House, Sligo. In 1889, he married Catherine O'Sullivan Morris.

Originally qualifying as a solicitor, he was called to the Bar in 1894. From 1904 to 1914 he was Senior Crown Prosecutor for County Leitrim and from 1914 to 1918 held the same position in County Sligo. He took silk in 1905 and was elected a bencher in 1909. He was a delegate to the Irish Convention in 1917–1918. In 1918 he briefly served as Solicitor-General for Ireland.

In 1918 he was appointed a judge of the Chancery Division of the High Court of Justice in Ireland, remaining in this post in the High Court of the Irish Free State until his death.

He was appointed to the Privy Council of Ireland in the 1920 Birthday Honours, allowing him to use the style "The Right Honourable".

References
Obituary, The Times, 14 September 1923

External links
 

1870 births
1923 deaths
Irish barristers
Irish solicitors
Members of the Privy Council of Ireland
Solicitors-General for Ireland
People from County Sligo
Judges of the High Court of Justice in Ireland